Quenisset is an impact crater on Mars, located in the Ismenius Lacus quadrangle at 34.6° N and 319.4° W. It measures 138 kilometer in diameter. Adopted by IAU's Working Group for Planetary System Nomenclature in 1973, the crater was named after French astronomer Ferdinand Quénisset.

Description 

Some close up images of the rim show old glaciers along the walls of smaller craters.  Some glaciers are called lobate debris aprons.

See also 
 Climate of Mars
 Impact event
 Glacier
 Glaciers on Mars 
 List of craters on Mars
 Lobate debris apron
 Ore resources on Mars
 Planetary nomenclature
 Water on Mars

References 

Impact craters on Mars
Ismenius Lacus quadrangle